Gacki may refer to the following places:
Gacki, Kuyavian-Pomeranian Voivodeship (north-central Poland)
Gacki, Pińczów County in Świętokrzyskie Voivodeship (south-central Poland)
Gacki, Staszów County in Świętokrzyskie Voivodeship (south-central Poland)
Gacki, Silesian Voivodeship (south Poland)